Pirata montanus is a species of wolf spider from the family Lycosidae. It can be found in the USA, Canada and Russia.

References

External links 
 Pirata montanus at The world spider catalog

Lycosidae
Spiders described in 1885
Spiders of the United States
Spiders of Canada
Spiders of Russia